Statistics of Swedish football Division 3 for the 1957–58 season.

League standings

Norra Norrland 1957–58

Mellersta Norrland 1957–58

Södra Norrland 1957–58

Norra Svealand 1957–58

Östra Svealand 1957–58

Västra Svealand 1957–58

Nordöstra Götaland 1957–58

Nordvästra Götaland 1957–58

Mellersta Götaland 1957–58

Sydöstra Götaland 1957–58

Sydvästra Götaland 1957–58

Södra Götaland 1957–58

Footnotes

References 

Swedish Football Division 3 seasons
3
Swed